The Neckar Viaduct at Weitingen is a bridge that crosses the valley of the River Neckar, near the town Horb am Neckar. The bridge is an important part of motorway A81's section Stuttgart - Singen.

Characteristics

Measurements
The bridge has an overall length of 900 meters, spans of 234-134-134-134-264 meters and a height of 125 meters above ground. The width of the bridge deck amounts to 31.5 meters.

Construction
The structure is a steel box girder, which is 10 meters wide and 6.10 meters tall.
A characteristic are the approach spans, which are cable trussed beams, to avoid pylons in the valley slopes. The south span is 264 meters long.

History
The bridge was handed over to the public in 1978. Directly east of the bridge is a 110 kV power line, hung on high anchor masts 70 meters high,
crosses the Neckar Valley from Eutingen to St. Georgen.

References

See also 
 List of bridges in Germany

Buildings and structures in Baden-Württemberg
Bridges completed in 1978
Road bridges in Germany
Viaducts in Germany